Boden Hockey, actually Bodens Hockeyförening or Bodens HF, is an ice hockey team in Boden, Sweden. They currently play in Division 1, the third level of ice hockey in Sweden. Their home arena is Björknäshallen. The club was founded on 3 December 2005 as the successor club to Bodens IK, which had gone into insolvency and folded two days earlier.

References

External links
Official website
Profile on Eliteprospects.com

Ice hockey teams in Sweden
2005 establishments in Sweden
Ice hockey clubs established in 2005
Sport in Boden, Sweden
Ice hockey teams in Norrbotten County